Ming is a C library for creating Adobe Flash (.swf) files. It is often packaged as a PHP module that allows for the dynamic generation of Flash animations. In addition to PHP, the library can also be used in the programming languages C++, Perl, Python, and Ruby.

Ming's core library is distributed under the terms of the GNU Lesser General Public License, and its makeswf command-line tool is distributed under the terms of the GNU General Public License, thus making Ming free software.

References

External links

Documentation
ming at PECL

C (programming language) libraries
Free multimedia software
Adobe Flash
Animation software